Chimdessa Debele (born 13 September 2003) is an Ethiopian long-distance runner. 

In 2022, he won the silver medal in the 10,000 metres at the African Championships. He competed in the senior men's race at the 2023 World Athletics Cross Country Championships, where he finished 11th and won a silver medal in the team competition.

References

External links 
 

Living people
2003 births
Place of birth missing (living people)
Ethiopian male long-distance runners
Ethiopian male cross country runners
21st-century Ethiopian people